Pierre Morad Omidyar (born Parviz Morad Omidyar, June 21, 1967) is a French-born Iranian-American billionaire. A technology entrepreneur, software engineer, and philanthropist, he is the founder of eBay, where he served as chairman from 1998 to 2015. Omidyar and his wife Pamela founded Omidyar Network in 2004. Forbes ranked Omidyar as the 24th-richest person in the world in 2021, with an estimated net worth of $9 billion.

Omidyar is a long-term Democratic Party donor. Since 2010, he has been involved in online journalism as the head of investigative reporting and public affairs news service Honolulu Civil Beat. In 2013, he announced that he would create and finance First Look Media, a journalism venture to include Glenn Greenwald, Laura Poitras, and Jeremy Scahill.

Early life and education
Omidyar was born in Paris, the son of Iranian parents who had immigrated to France for higher education. He was named Parviz. His mother, Elahé Mir-Djalali Omidyar, who earned her doctorate in linguistics at the Sorbonne, is an academic. His father, Cyrus Omidyar (born ), completed medical education and training in France and is a surgeon.

After immigrating with his family to the United States when Omidyar was a child, the father worked as a urologist at Johns Hopkins University in Baltimore, Maryland. He now practices in Aliso Viejo, California.

Omidyar attended Punahou School in Honolulu for a couple of years. (He now serves on its Board of Trustees). His interest in computers began while he was a ninth-grade student at The Potomac School in McLean, Virginia. He graduated in 1984 from St. Andrew's Episcopal School, Potomac, Maryland.

He started his undergraduate degree at Tufts University, and finished it at the University of California, Berkeley, graduating with a B.S. in computer science in 1988.

Career
Shortly after studying at Berkeley, Omidyar started working for Claris, an Apple Computer subsidiary. He worked with the team that upgraded MacDraw to MacDraw II. In 1991, he co-founded Ink Development, a pen-based computing startup that later was rebranded as an e-commerce company and renamed eShop Inc.

Microsoft acquired eShop on June 11, 1996, for less than $50 million, and Omidyar earned $1 million from the deal.

Founding eBay

In 1995, at the age of 28, Omidyar began to write the original computer code for an online venue to enable the listing of a direct person-to-person auction for collectible items. He created a simple prototype on his web page. On Labor Day, Monday, September 4, 1995, he launched an online service called Auction Web, which would eventually be developed as the auction site eBay.
 
The service was originally one of several items on Omidyar's website eBay.com. His website also had a section devoted to the Ebola virus, among other topics.

The first item sold on the eBay site was a broken laser pointer. Omidyar was astonished that anyone would pay for a broken device, but the buyer assured him that he was deliberately collecting broken laser pointers. Similar surprises followed. The business exploded as correspondents began to register trade goods of an unimaginable variety.

Omidyar incorporated the enterprise; the small fee he collected on each sale financed the expansion of the site. The revenue soon outstripped his salary at General Magic and nine months later, Omidyar decided to dedicate his full attention to his new enterprise.

By 1996, when Omidyar signed a licensing deal to offer airline tickets online, the site had hosted 250,000 auctions. In the first month of 1997, it hosted two million. By the middle of that year, eBay was hosting nearly 800,000 auctions a day.

In 1997, Omidyar changed the company's name from AuctionWeb to eBay, and began to advertise the service aggressively. The name "eBay" was his second choice. His first choice was already registered to a Canadian mining company, Echo Bay Mines.  He originally wanted Echo Bay, the name of a recreational area near Lake Mead, Nevada, because it "sounded cool".  When he learned  that echobay.com was taken, he dropped the "cho", and ebay.com was born. The frequently repeated story that eBay was founded to help Omidyar's fiancée trade Pez candy dispensers was fabricated by a public relations manager in 1997 to interest the media. This was revealed in Adam Cohen's 2002 book, and confirmed by eBay.

Later years
Jeffrey Skoll joined the company in 1996. In March 1998, Meg Whitman was brought in as president and CEO. She ran the company until January 2008, when she announced her retirement. In September 1998, eBay launched a successful public offering, making both Omidyar and Skoll billionaires.

In 2002, eBay bought PayPal, an online payment company. Later, in 2015, they spun PayPal off.  Omidyar still owns 6% of its worth .

, Omidyar's 178 million eBay shares were worth around $4.45 billion. Omidyar is an investor in Montage Resort and Spa in Laguna Beach, California.

Omidyar is also a member of the Berggruen Institute's 21st Century Council.

In 2020, Omidyar stepped down from the board of eBay as part of a broader overhaul of the company. He has, however, stayed active in the company, retaining the title of director emeritus.

News media businesses
In 2010, Omidyar launched an online investigative reporting news service, Honolulu Civil Beat, covering civic affairs in Hawaii. The site was named Best News Website in Hawaii for 2010, 2011, and 2012. On September 4, 2013, Honolulu Civil Beat started a partnership with HuffPost, launching HuffPost Hawaii.

In 2013, prompted by the Edward Snowden leaks, Omidyar announced the creation of the journalism venture First Look Media, which on February 10, 2014, launched The Intercept, drawing from journalists such as Glenn Greenwald, Laura Poitras, Jeremy Scahill, Dan Froomkin, John Temple, and Jay Rosen.

Film production
Omidyar has been part of the executive producer team for the following films.
Merchants of Doubt (2014)
Spotlight (2015)

Omidyar Network 

Omidyar Network is a philanthropic investment firm dedicated to harnessing the power of markets to create opportunity for people to improve their lives. It was established in 2004 by Omidyar and his wife, Pam. The organization invests in and helps scale innovative organizations to catalyze economic, social, and political change. To date, Omidyar Network has committed more than $992 million to for-profit companies and nonprofit organizations that foster economic advancement and encourage individual participation across multiple investment areas, including Property Rights, Governance & Citizen Engagement, Education, Financial Inclusion and Consumer & Internet Mobile. In 2010, he and his wife established, along with Richard Branson and the Nduna Foundation (founded by Amy Robbins), Enterprise Zimbabwe.

In 2018 Omidyar established the global philanthropic organisation named Luminate Group. He separated the organization into a separate unit from his ten-year Governance & Engagement initiative.

Personal life 

Omidyar and his wife Pamela own properties in Henderson, Nevada, and Honolulu, Hawaii. According to Forbes, his net worth was US$13.1 billion as of January 2019. He is a major donor to Democratic Party candidates and organizations.

Omidyar, a Buddhist follower of the Dalai Lama who in 2010 joined Bill Gates and Warren Buffett as a signatory of The Giving Pledge, has declared his intention to give away most of his wealth during his lifetime. In 2019, he donated approximately $500 million to charitable causes.

Antitrust activism and criticism of big tech 

He has bankrolled groups like the anti-monopoly think tank Open Markets Institute and the digital rights group Public Knowledge Project, in the fight against the big tech companies, which he criticizes as overly powerful and destructive to democracy.
His advocacy and philanthropic investment firm the Omidyar Network distributed widely read papers laying out the antitrust cases against Facebook and Google.   In February 2021, his network hosted a series on whistleblowing, and is now providing financial support to Facebook whistleblower Frances Haugen.
Omidyar has given funding to the Center for Humane Technology, whose head of public affairs is Haugen's top PR representative in the US.

Awards and honors 
 Honorary doctorate, Tufts University (2011)
 1999 EY Entrepreneur of The Year National Winner
 2000 Golden Plate Award of the American Academy of Achievement presented by Awards Council member Quincy Jones.
 2018's Third Most Influential French Entrepreneur by Richtopia.

See also 
 Iranian diaspora
 Omidyar-Tufts Microfinance Fund
 The World's Billionaires

Citations 

General sources

Further reading 
"An Interview With Pierre Omidyar". The New York Times, October 20, 2013. Retrieved October 21, 2013.
"Pierre Omidyar Ready To Spend $250 Million On Glenn Greenwald's News Startup". Forbes, October 16, 2013. Retrieved October 21, 2013.
"Snowden Journalist's New Venture to Be Bankrolled by eBay Founder". The New York Times, October 16, 2013. Retrieved October 21, 2013.
"The extraordinary promise of the new Greenwald-Omidyar venture". Columbia Journalism Review, October 17, 2013. Retrieved October 21, 2013.

External links 
 The Omidyar Group
 Omidyar Network

1967 births
21st-century philanthropists
American billionaires
American computer businesspeople
American people of Iranian descent
American philanthropists
Businesspeople of Iranian descent
EBay employees
French billionaires
French Buddhists
French businesspeople
French people of Iranian descent
21st-century French philanthropists
Giving Pledgers
Internet pioneers
Living people
Microfinance
Online retailer founders
People from Henderson, Nevada
Businesspeople from Paris
Santa Fe Institute people
Tufts University School of Engineering alumni
Businesspeople from Honolulu
UC Berkeley College of Engineering alumni
People named in the Paradise Papers